Sarton may refer to:

 8335 Sarton, a minor planet
 Sarton (crater), a crater on the Moon
 Sarton, Pas-de-Calais, a commune of Pas-de-Calais, France
 Sarton, West Virginia, United States
 George Sarton (1884–1956), Belgian-born American chemist and historian
 May Sarton (aka Eleanore Marie Sarton; 1912–1995), American poet, novelist and memoirist